Object: Alimony is a 1928 American silent drama film directed by Scott R. Dunlap and starring Lois Wilson, Hugh Allan, Ethel Grey Terry, Douglas Gilmore, and Roscoe Karns. The film was released by Columbia Pictures on December 22, 1928.

Cast
Lois Wilson as Ruth Rutledge
Hugh Allan as Jimmy Rutledge
Ethel Grey Terry as Mrs. Carrie Rutledge
Douglas Gilmore as Renaud Graham
Roscoe Karns as Al Bryant
Carmelita Geraghty as Mabel
Dickie Moore as Jimmy Rutledge Jr. (as Dickey Moore)
Jane Keckley as Boardinghouse Owner
Thomas A. Curran as Philip Stone (as Thomas Curran)

Preservation
The film is now considered lost.

References

External links

1928 drama films
Silent American drama films
1928 films
American silent feature films
American black-and-white films
Columbia Pictures films
Lost American films
1928 lost films
Lost drama films
1920s American films